Ceafornotensis is an extinct terrestrial  genus of beetles in the superfamily Scaraboidea , with only one member, Ceafornotensis archratiras. It is currently extinct globally. Its name is based on the  Old English word ceafor( chafer) and Greek word notius (south).

Entomology
The holotype specimen of C. archatiras is BP/2/18654, an exoskeleton as an compressed fossil in a large mudstone  in Orapa Diamond Mine near   Serowe,Botswana.

Taxonomy 
Ceafornotensis contains the following species:
 Ceafornotensis archratiras (based on the two Greek words archaíos (ancient) and  kratíras (crater) " in reference to the crater lake origin of the specimen".) Ecology
The mandible of C. archatiras'' does not link to any particular diet, and high chance it could an herbivore, scavenger, or fungivore.

References

†
Prehistoric beetle genera
†